Albert Wenzel "Red" Brosch (November 8, 1911 – December 10, 1975) was an American professional golfer.

Early life
Brosch was born in Farmingdale, New York, on November 8, 1911, to Henry J. Brosch and his wife Catherine. In June 1936, he married Ellen Fredericka Blixt.

Golf career
Brosch worked primarily as a club pro but also played on the PGA Tour, making 125 cuts between 1933 and 1962. He was the first player to shoot a round of 60 on the Tour, in the third round of the 1951 Texas Open. He went on to finish fourth, shooting a final-round 70 (268), three strokes out of the Dutch Harrison-Doug Ford playoff. Three weeks later, Brosch turned in his top PGA Tour performance, a runner-up finish at the St. Petersburg Open. He fell by six strokes to winner Jim Ferrier.

As a club pro, he worked primarily in the New York City area, including Bethpage, Cherry Valley Club, and Sands Point Golf Club. He won the Long Island Open 10 times, the Long Island PGA nine times, and the Metropolitan PGA six times.

Military service
He was drafted in 1943 and served in World War II, attaining the rank of corporal.

Death and legacy
Brosch died on December 10, 1975, and was interred in Long Island National Cemetery. Brosch was honored in 1975 as the PGA Metropolitan Section’s second Sam Snead Award recipient for his contributions to golf, the PGA and the Metropolitan Section.

Professional wins (25)
this list mat be incomplete
1938 Metropolitan PGA
1939 Long Island PGA Championship, Long Island Open
1940 Long Island PGA Championship
1941 Metropolitan PGA
1942 Long Island PGA Championship
1946 Long Island Open
1947 Metropolitan PGA, Long Island PGA Championship, Long Island Open
1948 Long Island Open
1949 Long Island PGA Championship, Long Island Open
1950 Metropolitan PGA, Long Island PGA Championship, Long Island Open
1951 Long Island PGA Championship, Long Island Open
1952 Metropolitan PGA
1953 Long Island Open
1956 Long Island Open
1959 Metropolitan PGA, Long Island PGA Championship, Long Island Open
1960 Long Island PGA Championship

Results in major championships

Note: Brosch never played in The Open Championship.

NT = no tournament
CUT = missed the half-way cut
R64, R32, R16, QF, SF = round in which player lost in PGA Championship match play
"T" indicates a tie for a place

References

American male golfers
PGA Tour golfers
Golfers from New York (state)
People from Farmingdale, New York
1911 births
1975 deaths